The 2012 JSM Challenger of Champaign–Urbana was a professional tennis tournament played on hard courts. It was the eleventh edition of the tournament which was part of the 2012 ATP Challenger Tour. It took place in Champaign, United States between 12 and 18 November 2012.

Singles main-draw entrants

Seeds

 1 Rankings are as of November 5, 2012.

Other entrants
The following players received wildcards into the singles main draw:
  Devin Britton
  Chase Buchanan
  Tim Kopinski
  Dennis Nevolo

The following players received entry from the qualifying draw:
  Andrei Dăescu
  Chris Guccione
  Christian Harrison
  Joshua Milton

Champions

Singles

 Tim Smyczek def.  Jack Sock, 2–6, 7–6(7–1), 7–5

Doubles

 Devin Britton /  Austin Krajicek def.  Jean Andersen /  Izak van der Merwe,  6–3, 6–3

External links
Official website

JSM Challenger of Champaign-Urbana
JSM Challenger of Champaign–Urbana
JSM Challenger of Champaign-Urbana
JSM Challenger of Champaign-Urbana
JSM Challenger of Champaign-Urbana